Renping Peninsula (Chinese:稔平半岛) is a peninsula between Daya Bay and Honghai Bay, Huidong County, Huizhou, Guangdong, China. It has a size of 742km2, and has a coastline 171.8 km long.

See also
Dapeng Peninsula
Pinghai Ancient City

References

Huizhou